The Northwestern Ontario Junior Hockey League (NWOJHL) was a Canadian Junior ice hockey league in the Northwestern Ontario region of Ontario.  The league ran from 1964 until 1970 as members of the Thunder Bay Amateur Hockey Association in direct competition for the Memorial Cup the Grand Championship of Canadian junior hockey.

History
Founded in 1964, the NWOJHL was a Junior A hockey league.  In the playoffs, after the league champions were determined, the winner of the NWOJHL would face the champion of the Thunder Bay Junior A Hockey League for the right to move on in the Memorial Cup playoffs.  The NWOJHL shared many centres with the North Shore Intermediate Hockey League which competed for the Hardy Cup.

The most prominent team in the league was the Schreiber North Stars, who would later gain fame as one of the top Junior B teams in Ontario and for competing at early Keystone Cups.

In 1970, junior hockey was realigned across Canada.  As early as 1969, the NWOJHL dropped to Junior B.  It is possible that the NWOJHL became the Thunder Bay Junior B Hockey League in 1970, as it had many of the same teams.  The TBJBHL lasted until 1977 when Junior hockey in Thunder Bay all but collapsed.  It migrated Eastward and became the North Shore Junior B Hockey League.

Teams
Atikokan Voyageurs
Geraldton Goldminers
Longlac Timber Wolves
Manitouwadge Copper Kings
Marathon Mercuries
Nip-Rock Rangers
Schreiber North Stars
Terrace Bay Superiors
Thunder Bay Blades

Champions
NWOJHL
1965 Schreiber North Stars
1966 Geraldton Goldminers
1967 Geraldton Goldminers
1968 Nip-Rock Rangers
1969 Schreiber North Stars
1970 Schreiber North Stars
1971 Schreiber North Stars
1972 Schreiber North Stars
1973 Marathon Mercuries
Thunder Bay Jr. B
1973 Schreiber North Stars (NWO Jr. B Champions)
1974 Schreiber North Stars
1975 Thunder Bay Blades
1976 Atikokan Voyageurs
1977 Schreiber North Stars
North Shore Jr. B
1978 Marathon Renegades
1979 Marathon A's
1980 Schreiber North Stars
1981 Nip-Rock Rangers

External links
Hockey Thunder Bay
Hockey Northwestern Ontario

Hockey Northwestern Ontario
Organizations based in Thunder Bay